An independence referendum was held in East Timor on 30 August 1999. The referendum's origins lay with the request made by the President of Indonesia, B. J. Habibie, to the United Nations Secretary-General Kofi Annan on 27 January 1999, for the United Nations to hold a referendum, whereby the Indonesian province would be given choice of either greater autonomy within Indonesia or independence.

Voters rejected the proposed special autonomy, leading to their separation from Indonesia. This led to mass violence and the destruction of infrastructure in East Timor, before the UN Security Council ratified the resolution on 15 September for the formation of a multinational force (INTERFET) to be immediately sent to East Timor to restore order and security and end the humanitarian crisis. East Timor would officially achieve recognised independence on 20 May 2002.

By many Indonesians (including the government), the referendum is also called the East Timorese people's consultation, since the referendum was legally non-binding and required the People's Consultative Assembly (MPR) resolution to revoke its previous 1978 resolution if the majority of voters rejected the proposal.

Background
Indonesia had initially invaded East Timor in December 1975, soon after the Revolutionary Front for an Independent East Timor (Fretilin), had declared the territory's independence. Indonesia annexed East Timor the following year, and under President Suharto, its occupation of the territory was often characterised by violence and brutality. Up until 1999, Indonesia was faced with constant pressure and criticism from the UN and the international community regarding its occupation of East Timor. The Dili massacre on 12 November 1991 increased international attention on the situation and further pressured Indonesia. More pressure on Indonesia followed when two East Timorese leaders - Bishop Carlos Ximenes Belo and José Ramos-Horta - received the Nobel Peace Prize in 1996.

B.J. Habibie succeeded Suharto in March 1998, and sought reform on the East Timor issue with international pressure mounting. Visiting diplomats from various countries such as Austria and the United Kingdom arrived in East Timor and in June 1998 affirmed that the East Timorese people should have the final decision regarding the region's commitment to Indonesia. In July, in the United States Senate, a resolution backed a United Nations led and supervised referendum for the East Timor to decide their attachment to Indonesia. On July 24, President Habibie decreed a series of withdrawals of Indonesian forces from the region. East Timor youths from July to September 1998 conducted a free speech campaign that demonstrated to the "UN and the Indonesian government their rejection of autonomy and endorsement of an UN-supervised referendum."

The Indonesian government was going through a period of reform during this period. It had invested largely in East Timor and Habibie faced pressure to protect Indonesia's interests in the territory, particularly from Indonesia's security branches: Dephankam (Department of Defence and Security), TNI (Armed Forces) and Deplu (Department of Foreign Affairs). Hoping to have East Timor accepted by the international community as a legitimate part of Indonesia, on January 27, 1999, Habibie announced that East Timor would be permitted to vote on accepting "autonomy" within Indonesia. If special autonomy in Indonesia was not accepted, then East Timor would be allowed independence. Many international and East Timorese leaders, including the jailed resistance leader Xanana Gusmão, asked for a five-to-ten year transition period, recognising that a quick all or nothing ballot could prove disastrous.

In the preceding months, President Habibie had made various public statements whereby he mentioned that the costs of maintaining monetary subsidies to support the province were not balanced by any measurable benefit to Indonesia. Due to this unfavourable cost-benefit analysis, the most rational decision would be for the province, which was not part of the original 1945 boundaries of Indonesia, to be given democratic choice on whether they wanted to remain within Indonesia or not. This choice was also in line with Habibie's general democratisation program in the immediate post-Suharto period.

As the follow-up step to Habibie's request, the United Nations organised a meeting between the Indonesian government and the Portuguese government (as the previous colonial authority over East Timor). On 5 May 1999, these talks resulted in the "Agreement between the Republic of Indonesia and the Portuguese Republic on the Question of East Timor" which spelled out the details of the requested referendum. The referendum was to be held to determine whether East Timor would remain part of Indonesia, as a Special Autonomous Region, or separate from Indonesia. The referendum was organised and monitored by the United Nations Mission in East Timor (UNAMET) and 450,000 people were registered to vote including 13,000 outside East Timor.

The UN Consultation, originally scheduled for 8 August 1999, was initially delayed until 30 August due to the deteriorating security circumstances created by Jakarta-backed militia violence.

Proposed special autonomy
The agreement between the Indonesian and Portuguese governments included a "Constitutional Framework for a special autonomy for East Timor" as an annexe. The framework would establish a "Special Autonomous Region of East Timor" (SARET),, within the unitary state of the Republic of Indonesia.

The institutions of the SARET would include an executive branch consisting of a Regional Governor (elected by the SARET legislature) and an advisory board, a legislative branch, the Regional Council of People's Representatives, an independent judiciary including Courts of First Instance, a Court of Appeal, a Court of Final Appeal and a Public Prosecutor's Office, and a regional police force.

The Indonesian government would retain control of defence, employment law, economic and fiscal policies and foreign relations, whilst Indonesian laws would have continuity in the territory. The autonomous government would have had competence over all matters not reserved for the Government of Indonesia, including the right to adopt a coat of arms as a symbol of identity. It would be able to designate persons as having "East Timorese identity" and could limit rights of land ownership for persons without this identity. A traditional civil code could also have been adopted. The SARET could enter into agreements with city and regional governments for economic, cultural and educational purposes. The SARET would have been entitled to participate in cultural and sporting organisations where other non-state entities participate.

Campaign
The Indonesian government did not invest much time or resources in demonstrating to the people of East Timor the benefits of retaining its autonomy with the state. The months leading up to the referendum were characterised by intimidation and acts of violence committed by pro-integrationist militia groups. In March 1999, U.S. military intelligence noted "close ties" between the military and local militias, "many created by Indonesian Special Forces and Intelligence officers". It specifically mentioned "Wiranto's decision in early 1999 to provide hundreds of weapons to militia groups". The new Indonesian leader President Habibie prior to the vote, stressed the advantages of East Timor accepting special autonomy within Indonesia, referring to the importance of "national unity" and wanting the developmental effort in East Timor to continue onwards.

Organisation
The United Nations Mission in East Timor (UNAMET) included the involvement of "240 international staff, 270 civilian police, 50 military liaison officers, 425 U.N. volunteers, and 668 local East Timorese staff for translation and driving," along with the additions of East Timorese people who were hired to help run the referendum. Special four wheel drive vehicles were flown into East Timor by the United Nations in order to cope with local conditions. All vehicles were fitted with radios which, together with 500 hand-held radios. The 5 May Agreement contained strict criteria on who could vote in the referendum. Those eligible to vote were defined as "persons born in East Timor", "persons born outside East Timor but with at least one parent having been born in East Timor", and "persons whose spouses fall under either of the two categories above". East Timorese living in exile overseas could also vote if they could get to polling centres in Portugal and Australia. In total, 200 registration centres were established in order to allow the East Timorese people to decide between the two options, which were either "Do you accept the proposed special autonomy for East Timor within the Unitary State of the Republic of Indonesia?" or "Do you reject the proposed special autonomy for East Timor, leading to East Timor's separation from Indonesia?".

Ballot paper and logos

Results
Voters were presented with the two following options:

Reactions

The aftermath of the referendum results saw mass violence, killings and destruction targeted at the East Timorese. Mass violence was reported in the region and the enclave of Oecussi-Ambeno saw 1,000 men, women, and children reportedly murdered immediately after the referendum. The International Commission of Inquiry on East Timor, released by the U.N. Office of the High Commissioner for Human Rights in January 2000, established that the TNI and the militias of East Timor were complicit in the violence and destruction that took place, which was based on the testimonies of East Timor peoples as well as United Nations staff. It concluded that the post referendum violence "took the form of vengeance" and included "executions, gender violence ("women were targeted for sexual assault in a cruel and systematic way"), destruction of 60 to 80 percent of both public and private property, disruption of up to 70 percent of the health services, and the displacement and forcible relocation of thousands of people to West Timor". The report thus confirms how the militia initiated violence was conducted to create the illusion of a civil conflict between East Timorese, and how the Indonesian army was "responsible for the intimidation, terror, killings and other acts of violence" committed in East Timor throughout 1999.

A multinational force was deployed by the UN Security Council on September 15 named InterFET, which was largely constituted by Australian Defence Force personnel under the command of Major-General Peter Cosgrove, to be deployed to East Timor to restore order and to establish and retain peace. When the UN returned to East Timor from 22 October after being forced to leave for genuine fear for its members, they found the territory destroyed with a population largely missing or terrified. "An estimated 80 percent of schools and clinics were destroyed, less than a third of the population remained in or near their homes, markets had been destroyed and transportation either stolen and taken across the border or burned, while telephone communications were nonexistent." Most of the trained professionals in East Timor happened to be Indonesian or Indonesia sympathisers, who largely left the territory after the results of the referendum.

The newly-elected People's Consultative Assembly accepted the result on 19 October 1999 by issuing a resolution, TAP MPR No. V/MPR/1999, on the East Timorese referendum, repealing the previous TAP MPR No. VI/MPR/1978 that formally annexed East Timor to Indonesia. The United Nations passed a resolution establishing the United Nations Transitional Administration in East Timor (UNTAET) that would lead to independence in May 2002.

References

Bibliography 

 Fox, James J., and Dionisio Babo-Soares, eds. Out of the ashes: destruction and reconstruction of East Timor. ANU E Press, 2003. 
 Kingsbury, Damien, and Michael Leach. East Timor: beyond independence. Monash University Press, 2007.
 Nordquist, Kjell-Åke. "Autonomy, Local Voices and Conflict Resolution: Lessons from East Timor." International Journal on Minority and Group Rights 20, no. 1 (2013): 107-117.
 Rabasa, Angel, and Peter Chalk. Indonesia's transformation and the stability of Southeast Asia. Rand Corporation, 2001.
 Sebastian, Leonard C., and Anthony L. Smith. "The East Timor crisis: a test case for humanitarian intervention." Southeast Asian Affairs 27 (2000): 73.

External links

 Full text of Agreement and Constitutional Framework
 UNAMET public information site

Indonesian occupation of East Timor
Post-Suharto era
Referendum
Referendums in East Timor
Referendums in Indonesia
East Timor
Separatism in Indonesia
East Timor
East Timor